Gordon Webber (October 25, 1912 – August 30, 1986) was an American writer.

Webber was born in Linden, Michigan, the son of Roy Eugene and Dorothea Boyd Webber. He graduated (c. 1934) from Jamestown College in Jamestown, ND, upon which he modeled the college in his "The Great Buffalo Hotel." From 1938 to 1948 he worked at NBC as a script writer and editor. Following this, he worked at Benton & Bowles, an advertising company, until 1975. He died in Montauk, New York of leukemia. He was married to Jeanne Curtis and is survived by three daughters, Jacqueline Webber, Dorothea Walker and Laura Circle.

Notable works
Years of Eden - 1951
The Far Shore - 1954
What End But Love - 1959
The Great Buffalo Hotel - 1979
Our Kind of People - 1979

References

American male novelists
1912 births
1986 deaths
20th-century American novelists
People from Genesee County, Michigan
People from Montauk, New York
20th-century American male writers